Gustave Charles Fagniez (6 October 1842 – 18 June 1927), French historian and archivist, was born in Paris on 6 October 1842. Trained at the École des Chartes and the École pratique des hautes études, he made his first appearance in the world of scholarship as the author of a book called Études sur l'industrie et la classe industrielle à Paris au XIIIe et au XIVe siècle (1877). This work, composed almost entirely from documents, many unpublished, opened a new field for historical study.

Twenty years later he supplemented this book by a collection of Documents relatifs à l'histoire de l'industrie et du commerce en France (2 volumes, 1898–1900), and in 1897 he published L'économie sociale de la France sous Henri IV, a volume containing the results of very minute research. He did not, however, confine himself to economic history. His Le Père Joseph et Richelieu (1894), though somewhat frigid and severe, is based on a mass of unpublished information, and shows remarkable psychological grasp.

In 1878 his Journal parisien de Jean de Maupoint, prieur de Sainte-Catherine-de-la-Couture was published in volume iv of the Mémoires de la Société de l'Histoire de Paris et de l'Île de France. He wrote numerous articles in the Revue historique (of which he was co-director with Gabriel Monod for some years) and in other learned reviews, such as the Revue des questions historiques and the Journal des savants. In 1901 he was elected member of the Académie des Sciences Morales et Politiques.

References 

 

1842 births
1927 deaths
University of Paris alumni
École Nationale des Chartes alumni
Members of the Académie des sciences morales et politiques
20th-century French historians
French male non-fiction writers
19th-century French historians